Seann Miley Moore is an Filipino-Australian singer, known for competing in season 12 of the X-Factor UK and in season 10 of The Voice Australia.

Career
In 2015, Moore competed in season 12 of the X-Factor UK at the age of 25 and made it to the final ten.

In 2017, he released his first EP called “Seann Miley Moore”, that consisted of four songs. He released his second EP, “4 Track Bitch” in 2018.

In 2021, he competed in season 10 of The Voice Australia on Jessica Mauboy’s team, he turned all four chairs in his blind audition where he performed The Prayer by Andrea Bocelli. That lead him to compete as one of the artists at Eurovision: Australia Decides 2022 with his song “My Body”.

Personal life
He was born in Indonesia. In 2003, he moved to Australia with his family. In his teenage years, he came out as gay.

Discography

Extended plays

Singles

References

Year of birth missing (living people)
Living people
The X Factor (British TV series) contestants
The Voice (franchise) contestants
21st-century Indonesian male singers
21st-century Australian male singers